is a Japanese female curler. She is a two-time  and a two-time Japan women's champion (2014, 2017).

Teams

Personal life
Her brother is  two-time Pacific-Asian champion curler Tetsuro Shimizu.

References

External links

Chubu Electric Power
Kazuizawa Curling Club: Official site (in Japanese)

Living people
1990 births
Japanese female curlers
Pacific-Asian curling champions
Japanese curling champions
Continental Cup of Curling participants
20th-century Japanese women
21st-century Japanese women